v2.0  is the second studio album by jazz piano trio GoGo Penguin.

Critical reception 
About v2.0, Bruce Lindsay says in All About Jazz that "v2.0 is the sound of a band moving forward—not in leaps and bounds, but in small steps. There's really no need to jump headlong into the unknown when the foundations set down on Fanfares were so strong. v2.0 builds on those foundations with style, further establishing GoGo Penguin as one of the most exciting young bands on the contemporary scene."

This album was nominated for the Mercury Prize in 2014.

Track listing 
Gondwana Records – GONDCD009DD & GONDLP009:

Personnel
 Chris Illingworth – piano
 Nick Blacka – Bass guitar
 Rob Turner – drums

References

2014 albums
GoGo Penguin albums